Great Overland Station, listed on the National Register of Historic Places as Union Pacific Railroad Passenger Depot, is a museum and former railroad station in Topeka, Kansas, United States.  The station was built from 1925 to 27 and designed by Gilbert Stanley Underwood, whose firm designed over 20 Union Pacific Railroad stations from 1924 to 1931. The station's Free Classical Revival design uses terra cotta extensively and features a center pavilion with two increasingly smaller pavilions on either side. Passenger service to the station began in January 1927; almost 20,000 people attended the station's grand opening, and the new station was considered "one of the largest and finest stations west of the Missouri River". In the later years of its train station life, it also hosted the passenger trains of the Chicago, Rock Island and Pacific Railroad (Rock Island Lines). The Atchison, Topeka and Santa Fe Railway 'Santa Fe' had its trains stop at its own Topeka station.

Passenger trains
Rock Island passenger trains included the:  
Golden State 
Imperial 
Oklahoma Rocket 
Twin Star Rocket
Union Pacific trains included the: 
City of St. Louis
Pony Express

Decline
Passenger totals at the station declined through the 1950s and 1960s, and the last regular passenger service to the station ended in 1971. The Union Pacific Railroad repurposed the station as office space and a customer service center before abandoning the building in 1989. In 1992, a fire damaged the western part of the station; the same year, the group Railroad Heritage, Inc. (then known as Topeka Railroad Days, Inc.) agreed to consider renovating the station. The station was extensively rehabilitated from 2000 to 2002 and is now a railroad heritage museum.

The Great Overland Station was added to the National Register of Historic Places on October 1, 2002.

References

External links

 Great Overland Station official website

Railway stations on the National Register of Historic Places in Kansas
Buildings and structures in Topeka, Kansas
Museums in Topeka, Kansas
Gilbert Stanley Underwood buildings
Union Pacific Railroad stations
Railroad museums in Kansas
Repurposed railway stations in the United States
National Register of Historic Places in Topeka, Kansas
Former railway stations in Kansas